Jeffrey Lee Eppinger (born ca 1960) is an American computer scientist, entrepreneur and Professor of the Practice at the Carnegie Mellon University, School of Computer Science, Institute for Software Research.

Eppinger was a student at Carnegie Mellon University where he earned a Bachelor of Science in 1982, a Master of Science in 1987, and a PhD in Computer Science in 1988. His advisors were Alfred Spector and Richard Rashid.

Eppinger was a co-founder of Transarc Corporation, which was bought by IBM in 1994.

At Carnegie Mellon, Eppinger's dissertation demonstrated the integration of the Mach Operating System's virtual memory with the Camelot Transaction System.  This recoverable virtual memory concept was subsequently used to implement the Coda File System.

In 1983, Eppinger won the George E. Forsythe Award for his research in binary search trees. Eppinger had made empirical studies of their behaviour under random deletions and insertions.

References

External links
 Jeff Eppinger's Home

1960s births
Living people
American computer scientists
Carnegie Mellon University alumni